In mathematics, given two preordered sets  and  the product order (also called the coordinatewise order or componentwise order) is a partial ordering on the Cartesian product  Given two pairs  and  in  declare that  if and only if  and  

The lexicographic order of totally ordered sets is a linear extension of their product order, and thus the product order is a subrelation of the lexicographic order.

The Cartesian product with the product order is the categorical product in the category of partially ordered sets with monotone functions.

The product order generalizes to arbitrary (possibly infinitary) Cartesian products. 
Suppose  is a set and for every   is a preordered set. 

 if and only if  for every  

If every  is a partial order then so is the product preorder. 

Furthermore, given a set  the product order over the Cartesian product  can be identified with the inclusion ordering of subsets of 

The notion applies equally well to preorders. The product order is also the categorical product in a number of richer categories, including lattices and Boolean algebras.

References

See also

 Direct product of binary relations
 Examples of partial orders
 Star product, a different way of combining partial orders
 Orders on the Cartesian product of totally ordered sets
 Ordinal sum of partial orders
 

Order theory